Robin Mackin (born 31 August 1987) is a Canadian softball player. She competed in the women's tournament at the 2008 Summer Olympics. She played collegiate softball at Fresno State and Nebraska.

References

External links
 

1987 births
Living people
Canadian softball players
Olympic softball players of Canada
Softball players at the 2008 Summer Olympics
Sportspeople from Newmarket, Ontario
Fresno State Bulldogs softball players
Nebraska Cornhuskers softball players